The Arthur D. Silva Water Tank near Shoshone, Idaho, United States, was built in 1910.  It was a work of sheep rancher and stonemason Bill Darrah and of stonemasons Pete Duffy & Sons.  It was listed on the National Register of Historic Places in 1983.

It is covered by a concrete-covered wooden top.

The tank was deemed significant as an example of water tank construction, as an example of lava rock work by masons Bill Darrah and Pete Duffy and sons, and for its association with Portuguese settlement in South Central Idaho.  It was built by Darrah in the late 1910s and was built higher by the Duffys in the late 1920s.

See also
Arthur D. Silva Ranch, NRHP-listed
Arthur D. Silva Flume, NRHP-listed
Manuel Silva Barn, NRHP-listed, a work of another local stonemason

References

Buildings and structures in Lincoln County, Idaho
Agricultural buildings and structures on the National Register of Historic Places in Idaho
Infrastructure completed in 1910
National Register of Historic Places in Lincoln County, Idaho